In mathematics, and more particularly in analytic number theory, Perron's formula is a formula due to Oskar Perron to calculate the sum of an arithmetic function, by means of an inverse Mellin transform.

Statement
Let  be an arithmetic function, and let

 
be the corresponding Dirichlet series. Then Perron's formula is

Here, the prime on the summation indicates that the last term of the sum must be multiplied by 1/2 when x is an integer. The integral is not a convergent Lebesgue integral; it is understood as the Cauchy principal value. The formula requires that c > 0, c > σ, and x > 0.

Proof
An easy sketch of the proof comes from taking Abel's sum formula

This is nothing but a Laplace transform under the variable change  Inverting it one gets Perron's formula.

Examples
Because of its general relationship to Dirichlet series, the formula is commonly applied to many number-theoretic sums. Thus, for example, one has the famous integral representation for the Riemann zeta function:

and a similar formula for Dirichlet L-functions:

where

Other examples appear in the articles on the Mertens function and the von Mangoldt function.

Generalizations

Perron's formula is just a special case of the Mellin discrete convolution

where 

 

and 

 

the Mellin transform. The Perron formula is just the special case of the test function  for  the Heaviside step function.

References 
 Page 243 of 
  
 

Theorems in analytic number theory
Calculus
Integral transforms
Summability methods